Pavel Chernyshov (born 12 July 1995) is a Belarusian former professional footballer.

References

External links
 
 
 Profile at Gomel website

1995 births
Living people
Belarusian footballers
Association football midfielders
FC Gomel players
FC UAS Zhitkovichi players
FC Sputnik Rechitsa players